Ha Mots'eremeli is a small village north of Teyateyaneng, Lesotho. The hamlet is known for its football team, Melodi FC.

Populated places in Lesotho